Osoiu River may refer to:
 Oșoiu River (Bistrița), Suceava County, Romania
 Ușoiu, a tributary of the Grosul in Arad County, Romania